Physatocheila is a genus of lace bugs in the family Tingidae. There are at least 50 described species in Physatocheila.

Species

References

Further reading

 
 
 

Tingidae